Nawab Muhammad Khan Shahwani (Urdu نواب محمد خان شاهوانى) is a Pakistani politician who is a member of the Provincial Assembly of Balochistan. Nawab Muhammad Khan Shahwani is Tumandar of Shahwani tribe.

References

Living people
Pakistani politicians
Year of birth missing (living people)